National Cultural Sites of Uganda are a type of cultural heritage monuments, defined by the Uganda Museum. The sites are subdivided by administrative region and listed below.

 List of National Cultural Sites in Central Region, Uganda
 List of National Cultural Sites in Western Region, Uganda
 List of National Cultural Sites in Eastern Region, Uganda
 List of National Cultural Sites in Northern Region, Uganda

References

Cultural heritage monuments in Uganda
Buildings and structures in Uganda